This is a discography of Steven Wilson's solo albums, his work with the band Porcupine Tree, his side projects and collaborations with other artists.

Early projects and releases

Altamont
Altamont were an electronica and krautrock duo formed by Steven Wilson and Simon "Si" Vockings. It existed between 1983–1984; Wilson was 15 years old at that time. All of the music was improvised live onto cassette using primitive analog synthesizers and a home made echo machine.

Amber Dawn
Amber Dawn were a progressive rock band active in early 1980s. It was the first "real band" Wilson was a member of. It disbanded in 1982 when the band's bassist left the band to go to university. The band released one cassette, which was recorded in a proper studio.

God
God were an art pop duo formed by Wilson and Richard "Ford" Leggott. It was active in 1987–1993 during which many recordings were made but not published in any way. In 2019, Wilson released three songs from God era as an EP.

Karma
Karma were a band that existed between 1982–1986. It featured Wilson and three of his schoolmates. Both albums were recorded and self-released by Wilson and Marc Gordon, the drummer of the band. There are also several existing live recordings of the Karma era, but they are single copy cassettes owned by Wilson that have never been published.

Bass Communion

Blackfield

Continuum

Incredible Expanding Mindfuck

No-Man

Porcupine Tree

Storm Corrosion

Solo work

Studio albums

Live albums

Compilation albums

EPs

Soundtracks

Singles

Music videos

 a – Each CD-R copy of Unreleased Electronic Music Vol. 1 contains its own one of a kind original Polaroid photograph taken by Lasse Hoile specifically for the project. David Schroeder has set up a webpage dedicated to displaying Hoile's polaroids in numerical order along with their owner's names. Some of these Polaroids can now be found in the "Old Polaroids" album at Hoile's MySpace page.

Separate tracks
Tracks released separately by Wilson via Internet through his MySpace and SoundCloud accounts.

Guest appearances and contributions

Album remixes
Steven Wilson has created 5.1 surround sound mixes (usually also accompanied by a new stereo mix appearing on the same release) for artists including King Crimson, Emerson, Lake & Palmer, Jethro Tull, Yes, XTC, Hawkwind, Gentle Giant, and Caravan, for the following albums:

References

External links
Steven Wilson Headquarters
The complete Steven Wilson discography (11th Edition)

Discographies of British artists
Rock music discographies